Callixena versicolora is a moth of the family Noctuidae first described by Max Saalmüller in 1891. The species can be found in Africa, where it is known from Ghana, Nigeria, the Democratic Republic of the Congo, Malawi, Kenya, South Africa, Comoros, Madagascar and Réunion.

This species has a wingspan from 29 to 40 mm.

References
 Saalmüller & von Heyden (1891). Lepidopteren von Madagascar. Zweite Abtheilung. Heterocera: Noctuae, Geometrae, Microlepidoptera. :247–531, pls. 7–14

External links
Africamuseum.be - Types
 drlegrain.be: Pictures of Callixena versicolora

Hadeninae
Moths of Madagascar
Lepidoptera of West Africa
Moths of the Comoros
Moths of Réunion
Moths of Africa
Moths described in 1891